Ana Maria Rubio Zavala (born 21 February 1993) is a former Spanish Paralympic swimmer who competed in international level events. She was born with no fingers on her left hand.

References

1993 births
Living people
Sportspeople from Irun
Paralympic swimmers of Spain
Swimmers at the 2008 Summer Paralympics
S10-classified Paralympic swimmers